Mtshabezi Dam is a reservoir on the Mtshabezi River, Zimbabwe, with a capacity of 11.4 million cubic metres. After the completion and commissioning of a pipeline linking it to Mzingwane Dam in 2013, Mtshabezi Dam became the city of Bulawayo's 6th supply dam.

References

Dams in Zimbabwe
Shashe River